Hitjivirue Kaanjuka (born 29 December 1987) is a Namibian sprinter who competes in the 200 metres event.

At the 2008 African Championships he finished fifth in the 100 metres race and seventh in the 200 metres. He also competed at the 2007 World Championships without progressing from the initial heat.

Kaanjuka won the silver medal in the 4 × 100 metres relay at the 2015 African Games, together with teammates Even Tjiviju, Dantago Gurirab and Jesse Urikhob. Their time of 39.22 seconds is the Namibian record.

References

1987 births
Living people
Namibian male sprinters
World Athletics Championships athletes for Namibia
Athletes (track and field) at the 2015 African Games
African Games silver medalists for Namibia
African Games medalists in athletics (track and field)